The following is the 1975–76 network television schedule for the three major English language commercial broadcast networks in the United States. The schedule covers primetime hours from September 1975 through August 1976. The schedule is followed by a list per network of returning series, new series, and series cancelled after the 1974–75 season. All times are Eastern and Pacific, with certain exceptions, such as Monday Night Football.

This was the first season since 1971 in which a four-hour Sunday night schedule was implemented.

This was also the first season for the 22-hour weekly prime-time schedule (four hours on Sunday, three hours each on Monday through Saturday).  It remains in effect to this day.

New series are highlighted in bold.  Each of the 30 highest-rated shows is listed with its rank and rating as determined by Nielsen Media Research.

 Yellow indicates the programs in the top 10 for the season.
 Cyan indicates the programs in the second 10 for the season.
 Magenta indicates the programs in the third 10 for the season.

PBS is not included; member stations have local flexibility over most of their schedules and broadcast times for network shows may vary.

Sunday 

Note: As of the 2020–21 television season, since December 1975, 60 Minutes has continually aired at the same 7:00 PM ET (or after sporting event overrun) time slot on CBS.

Monday

Tuesday 

Note: Beginning March 9, Family was added onto ABC's lineup, replacing Marcus Welby, M.D..

Wednesday 

Note: The Best of Sanford and Son consisted of reruns of Sanford and Son from earlier seasons; Sanford and Son continued to air in its normal Friday 8:00-8:30 time slot during The Best of Sanford and Sons run. Hawk consisted of reruns of the 1966 ABC television series.

Thursday

Friday

Saturday

By network

ABC

Returning Series
The ABC Sunday Night Movie
ABC NFL Monday Night Football
Almost Anything Goes
Baretta
Barney Miller
Happy Days
Harry O
Marcus Welby, M.D.
Monday Night Baseball (moved from NBC)
The Rookies
The Six Million Dollar Man
The Streets of San Francisco
S.W.A.T.
That's My Mama

New Series
Barbary Coast
Bert D'Angelo/Superstar *
The Bionic Woman *
Donny & Marie *
Family *
Good Heavens *
Laverne & Shirley *
Matt Helm
Mobile One
On the Rocks
Rich Man, Poor Man *
Saturday Night Live with Howard Cosell
Starsky & Hutch *
The Swiss Family Robinson
Viva Valdez *
Welcome Back, Kotter
When Things Were Rotten

Not returning from 1974–75:
ABC Movie of the Week
Caribe
Get Christie Love!
Hot l Baltimore
The Jim Stafford Show
Karen
Keep on Truckin'
Kodiak
Kolchak: The Night Stalker
Kung Fu
Nakia
The New Land 
The Odd Couple
Paper Moon
The Sonny Comedy Revue
The Texas Wheelers

CBS

Returning Series
60 Minutes *
All in the Family
Barnaby Jones
The Bob Newhart Show
Cannon
The Carol Burnett Show
Cher
Good Times
Hawaii Five-O
I've Got a Secret *
The Jeffersons
Johnny Cash and Friends
Kojak
M*A*S*H
The Mary Tyler Moore Show
Maude
Medical Center
Rhoda
CBS Thursday Night Movie
Tony Orlando and Dawn
The Waltons

New Series
Beacon Hill
Big Eddie
The Blue Knight *
Bronk
The Bugs Bunny/Road Runner Show *
Doc
Ivan the Terrible *
The Jacksons *
Joe and Sons
Kate McShane
The Kelly Monteith Show *
One Day at a Time *
Phyllis
Popi *
Sara *
The Sonny and Cher Show *
Switch
Three for the Road

Not returning from 1974–75:
Apple's Way
The Dick Cavett Show
The Friday Comedy Special
Friends and Lovers
Frigidaire Spring Feature
Gunsmoke
Khan!
Manhattan Transfer
The Manhunter
Mannix
Planet of the Apes
Sons and Daughters

NBC

Returning Series
Chico and the Man
Columbo
Emergency!
Little House on the Prairie
The Mac Davis Show
McCloud
McMillan & Wife
Movin' On
The NBC Mystery Movie
NBC Monday Night at the Movies
NBC Saturday Night at the Movies
Petrocelli
Police Story
Police Woman
The Rockford Files
Sanford and Son
The Wonderful World of Disney

New Series
City of Angels *
The Cop and the Kid *
Doctors' Hospital
The Dumplings *
Ellery Queen
The Family Holvak
Fay
Grady *
The Invisible Man
Jigsaw John *
Joe Forrester
The John Davidson Show *
McCoy
Medical Story
The Montefuscos
NBC Thursday Night at the Movies
The Practice *
The Rich Little Show *

Not returning from 1974–75:
Adam-12
Amy Prentiss
Archer
Ben Vereen...Comin' At Ya
The Bob Crane Show
Born Free
The Gladys Knight & the Pips Show
Ironside
Lucas Tanner
Monday Night Baseball (moved to ABC)
Sierra
The Smothers Brothers Show
Sunshine

Note: The * indicates that the program was introduced in midseason.

References

Additional sources 
 Castleman, H. & Podrazik, W. (1982). Watching TV: Four Decades of American Television. New York: McGraw-Hill. 314 pp.
 McNeil, Alex. Total Television. Fourth edition. New York: Penguin Books. .
 Brooks, Tim & Marsh, Earle (1985). The Complete Directory to Prime Time Network TV Shows (3rd ed.). New York: Ballantine. .

United States primetime network television schedules
1975 in American television
1976 in American television